Veterans Day is an annual observance in the Republic of Korea marked on 8 October.

South Korean culture
October observances
Autumn events in South Korea